NXT UK TakeOver: Cardiff was the second NXT UK TakeOver professional wrestling livestreaming event produced by WWE. It was held exclusively for wrestlers from the promotion's NXT UK brand division. The event aired exclusively on the WWE Network and took place on 31 August 2019, at the Motorpoint Arena Cardiff in Cardiff, Wales.

Six matches were contested at the event. In the main event, Walter retained the WWE United Kingdom Championship against Tyler Bate. Other matches included Mark Andrews and Flash Morgan Webster defeating defending champions Zack Gibson and James Drake and Gallus (Mark Coffey and Wolfgang) in a triple threat tag team match to win the NXT UK Tag Team Championship, and Kay Lee Ray defeated Toni Storm to win the NXT UK Women's Championship.

Production

Background 
TakeOver was a series of professional wrestling shows that began on 29 May 2014, when WWE's NXT brand held their second live special on the WWE Network. The NXT UK brand debuted in June 2018 and subsequently adopted the TakeOver name for their live WWE Network specials, beginning with NXT UK TakeOver: Blackpool in January 2019. TakeOver: Cardiff was scheduled as the second NXT UK TakeOver event. It was held on 31 August 2019, at the Motorpoint Arena Cardiff and was named after the venue's city of Cardiff, Wales.

Storylines 

The card included six matches that resulted from scripted storylines. Wrestlers portrayed heroes, villains, or less distinguishable characters in scripted events that built tension and culminated in a wrestling match or series of matches. Results were predetermined by WWE's writers on the NXT UK brand, while storylines were produced on their weekly television programme, NXT UK.

On the 19 June episode of NXT UK, Kay Lee Ray won a battle royal for an opportunity to face Toni Storm for the NXT UK Women's Championship at a time of her choosing by last eliminating Xia Brookside. On the 17 July episode of NXT UK, Ray interrupted Storm and announced that their title match would take place at TakeOver: Cardiff.

On the 3 July episode of NXT UK during Moustache Mountain's NXT UK Tag Team Championship match, Imperium interfered and attacked and injured Tyler Bate. On the 31 July episode, Bate returned and attacked Imperium and a WWE United Kingdom Championship match between Walter and Tyler Bate was made for TakeOver: Cardiff.

On the 7 August episode of NXT UK, Gallus and Mark Andrews & Flash Morgan Webster wanted to face Grizzled Young Veterans for the NXT UK Tag Team Championship. Later in that episode, Mark Andrews and Flash Morgan had to prove themselves in order to make the match a triple-threat tag team match at TakeOver: Cardiff. Webster defeated Gallus' Mark Coffey on the 14 August episode, and Andrews defeated James Drake on the 21 August episode, making it a triple-threat tag team match at TakeOver: Cardiff.

Event

Preliminary matches 
The event opened with Noam Dar facing Travis Banks. Dar performed a Nova Roller on Banks to win the match.
 
Next, Cesaro faced Ilja Dragunov. Cesaro performed a Pop Up European Uppercut and a Neutralizer on Dragunov to win the match.

After that, The Grizzled Young Veterans (Zack Gibson and James Drake) defended the NXT UK Tag Team Championship against Gallus (Mark Coffey and Wolfgang) and Mark Andrews and Flash Morgan Webster. Andrews performed a Shooting Star Press on Gibson and Webster pinned Gibson to win the title.

Later, Joe Coffey faced Dave Mastiff in a Last Man Standing match. In the end, Coffey and Mastiff fell off a production crate through a table. Mastiff could not stand by a ten count, meaning Coffey won.

In the penultimate match, Toni Storm defended the NXT UK Women's Championship against Kay Lee Ray. Ray performed a Rope-Hung Gory Bomb and a second Gory Bomb on Storm to win the title.

Main event 
In the main event, Walter defended the WWE United Kingdom Championship against Tyler Bate. Walter performed a Powerbomb onto the ring apron and a Powerbomb into the ring post on Bate. Bate performed a Tyler Driver '97 on Walter for a two-count. Bate performed a Corkscrew Senton Bomb on Walter for a two-count. Walter performed a Diving Splash on Bate for a two-count. Walter performed a Folding Powerbomb on Bate for a one-count. Walter performed a Lariat on Bate to retain the title.

Reception
Larry Csonka of 411mania.com gave it an 8.5 out of 10 stating "NXT UK TakeOver: Cardiff 2019 was a tremendous success and a vast improvement over their first TakeOver effort. Cesaro came off like a big star, the title changes made sense, there was a ton of quality wrestling and WALTER vs. Bate was an instant classic. If you haven’t followed the brand, make time to catch this show." Dave Meltzer of the Wrestling Observer Newsletter also gave the event high marks overall and ranked each match as follows: 2.5 stars for Noam Dar vs. Travis Banks, 4 stars for Cesaro vs. Ilja Dragunov, 4.5 stars for the triple threat NXT UK Tag Team Championship match, 2.5 stars for the Last Man Standing Match, 3.25 stars for the NXT UK Women's Championship match and 5.25 stars for the United Kingdom Championship match, making it the third WWE match to break the 5 star rating system.

Results

References

External links
 

Cardiff
2019 in Wales
2019 WWE Network events
Events in Cardiff
August 2019 events in the United Kingdom
WWE international